Carlos Avelar (born April 2, 1954) is a former member of the Arizona House of Representatives. He served in the House from January 1999 through January 2003, serving district 23. After redistricting in 2002, he ran for re-election, this time in District 16, but lost in the Democrat primary to Leah Landrum Taylor and Ben Miranda. He again ran in 2006 in District, but once more lost in the Democrat primary, this time to Cloves Campbell Jr. and Ben Miranda.

References

Democratic Party members of the Arizona House of Representatives
Hispanic and Latino American state legislators in Arizona
1954 births
Living people